Milton Highlands  (2021 population: 320) is a designated place within Municipality of the District of Yarmouth in Nova Scotia, Canada.

Demographics 

References 

Communities in Yarmouth County
General Service Areas in Nova Scotia
Designated places in Nova Scotia